Iron Fisted Eagle's Claw is 1979 Hong Kong-Taiwan martial art movie directed by To Man Bo and starring Bruce Liang and Chi Kuan-chun. The movie is also known as Young Moon Ho Gaek (용문호객) in Korea and Der Kleine und der Drunken Master as a German release.

Plot

Chu Kun (Chi Kuan Chun) and Benny Pang (Bruce Liang), fight against the Tiger's group to avenge for Captain Liu and save the town. To do this, Chu Kun and Pang learns secret iron fisted kung fu from the book that old Drunken Mater gave (played by Philip Ko). Soon Chu Kun and Pang masters secret and powerful iron fist and fight against the Tiger's group.

Casts and Directors
Leung Siu-lung as Benny Pang/Pang
Chi Kuan-chun as Chu Kun
Chan Sing as Tiger/Big Brother
Philip Ko as the Drunken Master
Park Jong Kuk as Captain Liu
Kim Yu Haeng as first Brother
Lam Hak Ming as third Brother
Yuen Tau Wan as second Brother
Lai Sau Kit as fourth Brother
Kwak Mu Seong
Steve Mak
Lau Yuen

Additional Staffs
Leung Siu-lung - Action Choreographer 
Alan Chui Chung-San - Action Choreographer
Lam Hak Ming - Action Choreographer
To Man Bo - Director
Kim Ki Young - Producer
Wu Fan Shen - Cinematographer
Eddie Wang - Composer
Yu Sun - Editor
Kong Yang - Screenplay

Production
The movie was filmed in South Korea and released in Taiwan and Hong Kong.

References

External links

http://hkmdb.com/db/movies/view.mhtml?id=10339&display_set=eng

South Korean martial arts films
Taiwanese martial arts films
1979 action films
1979 films
Kung fu films
Hong Kong martial arts films
Mandarin-language films
1970s Hong Kong films